Nargis Hameedullah (born 15 December 1998; Quetta, Pakistan) is a Pakistani karateka who won bronze medal in the 2018 Asian Games. This was the first ever medal for Pakistan in Asian Games karate competitions.

Early life
Nargis was born in Quetta, Balochistan on 15 December 1998. She belongs to Quetta's Hazara community.

Professional career
Nargis is the first female karate instructor of Quetta and has represented Pakistan internationally.

Nargis defeated Nepal's Karki Rita 3-1 in the match played for Bronze medals on 25 August 2018. Nargis won this bronze medal in over sixty-eight kilograms category competition. She won gold medal in the South Asian Championship in Colombo, Sri Lanka in 2017. She is also part of Pakistan Female Karate Association. She teaches karate to girls at a Quetta club and says "through karate, girls can defend themselves".

References

Living people
1998 births
Pakistani female karateka
Hazara sportspeople
Pakistani people of Hazara descent
People from Quetta
Asian Games medalists in karate
Karateka at the 2018 Asian Games
Medalists at the 2018 Asian Games
Asian Games bronze medalists for Pakistan
South Asian Games gold medalists for Pakistan
South Asian Games silver medalists for Pakistan
South Asian Games medalists in karate
20th-century Pakistani women
21st-century Pakistani women